Dennis Schulp (born 18 January 1978) is a Dutch former professional footballer who played as a striker.

Career 
Born in Amsterdam, North Holland, Schulp made his professional debut for Ajax on 27 March 1996 replacing Patrick Kluivert after 78 minutes. He later played for FC Volendam, Willem II Tilburg, NEC Nijmegen, De Graafschap, Helmond Sport, FC Den Bosch and SC Paderborn 07 (Germany). Schulp joined Wuppertal in January 2008, six months after leaving SC Paderborn and left the club again on 31 December 2010.

References

External links
 OnsOranje profile
 

1978 births
Living people
Dutch footballers
Footballers from Amsterdam
Association football forwards
Netherlands under-21 international footballers
Eredivisie players
Eerste Divisie players
2. Bundesliga players
3. Liga players
AFC Ajax players
FC Volendam players
Willem II (football club) players
NEC Nijmegen players
De Graafschap players
Helmond Sport players
FC Den Bosch players
SC Paderborn 07 players
Wuppertaler SV players
VV DOVO players
Dutch expatriate footballers
Dutch expatriate sportspeople in Germany
Expatriate footballers in Germany